Anne Nicole Voullemier, also called Mademoiselle Voullemier (born 1796 in Châtillon-sur-Seine - died 1886) was a French painter and lithographer. She signed her name Mlle Voullemier.

Biography
Anne Nicole Voullemier was a student of Jean-Baptiste Regnault for oil painting, and of Louis-François Aubry for miniature painting.

She exhibited her miniature portraits at the Salon from 1817 to 1835.

In 1817, she exhibited Une soubrette écoutant à une porte (A maid listening at a door), miniature bought by the Duchess of Berry and La sœur de charité. In 1819, she exposed Portrait of M. Collin, grand vicar, in 1822, Sisters of Charity visiting a sick person and The Curious. In 1824, she presented The confessional.

The productions of Mlle. Voullemier have often appeared at the exhibitions of Douai, Lille and Cambrai. Several paintings were lithographed by the author, among others: The Sister of Charity, The Clergyman Consoling a Prisoner, The Fortune Tellers.

She gave lessons in oil painting and miniature painting.

She won the 3rd class medal at the 1835 Salon, worth 250 gold francs, and the 2nd class medal at the 1845 Salon, worth 500 gold francs.

Works

References

1796 births
1886 deaths
French women painters
19th-century French painters
People from Châtillon-sur-Seine